Krasnopushcha is a village in Ternopil Raion, Ternopil Oblast, Ukraine. It belongs to Berezhany urban hromada, one of the hromadas of Ukraine.

Until 18 July 2020, Krasnopushcha belonged to Berezhany Raion. The raion was abolished in July 2020 as part of the administrative reform of Ukraine, which reduced the number of raions of Ternopil Oblast to three. The area of Berezhany Raion was merged into Ternopil Raion.

Population
Population in 2001: 191 inhabitants with over 40 houses.

Gallery

References

Sources

External links

Berezhany urban hromada
Villages in Ternopil Raion